Fourplay is a 2018 American comedy-drama film directed by Dean Matthew Ronalds, starring Tammy Blanchard, Bryan Greenberg, Dominic Fumusa and Emanuela Galliussi.

Cast
 Tammy Blanchard as Anna
 Bryan Greenberg as Tom
 Dominic Fumusa as Joe
 Emanuela Galliussi as Susan

Release
The film was released on 30 March 2018.

Reception
Frank Schenk of The Hollywood Reporter wrote that the film "comes across as a claustrophobic cinematic exercise."

Robert Abele of the Los Angeles Times wrote that "The actors gamely strive for conversational naturalism, but what they say matters little because you never sense anything other than an environment rigged to explode, rather than nurtured into emotional relevance."

References

External links
 
 

American comedy-drama films
2018 comedy-drama films